The Awapuni Gold Cup is held annually in Palmerston North, New Zealand. It is a set weight and penalties race over 2,000 metres.

History

First held in 1915, the race has been won by many of New Zealand's most famous racehorses including:
 Desert Gold, 
 Redcraze, 
 Mainbrace, 
 Grey Way, 
 Balmerino, 
 La Mer, 
 Show Gate, 
 Horlicks, the 1989 Japan Cup winner
 Nightmarch and 
 Kindergarten.

Desert Gold and Sir Slick have won the race three times.

Recent winners

List of other winners

 1915 Chortle
 1916 Desert Gold
 1917 Desert Gold
 1918 Desert Gold
 1919 Sasanof
 1920 Amythas
 1921 Sasanos
 1922 Marqueteur
 1923 Thespian
 1924 Ballymena
 1925 Suggestion
 1926 Rapine
 1927 Commendation
 1928 Star Stranger
 1929 Rapier
 1930 Vertigern
 1931 Nightmarch
 1932 Nightmarch
 1933 Autopay
 1934 Silver Ring
 1935 Silver Ring
 1936 Greek Shepherd
 1937 Wild Chase
 1938 Stretto
 1939 Beaupartir
 1940 Beau Vite
 1941 Kindergarten
 1946 Langue Dor
 1947 Beau Le Havre
 1948 Voltaic
 1949 Lord Mania
 1950 Beaumaris
 1951 Mainbrace
 1952 Hutton
 1953 Gendarme
 1954 Golden Tan
 1955 Redcraze
 1956 Syntax
 1957 Berne
 1958 Bridie
 1959 Picaroon
 1960 Picaroon
 1961 Ilumquh
 1962 Key
 1963 Moy
 1964 Tatua
 1965 Royal Duty
 1966 Palisade
 1967 Terrific
 1968 Impetus
 1969 Aquarelle
 1970 Bardall
 1971 Game
 1972 Young Ida
 1973 Young Ida
 1974 Show Gate
 1975 Hi Bing
 1976 Grey Way 
 1977 Balmerino
 1978 La Mer
 1979 Regal Band
 1980 Serendiper
 1981 Mun Lee
 1982 The Twinkle
 1983 Commissionaire
 1984 Commissionaire
 1985 Catiere
 1986 Abit Leica
 1987 Lacka Reason
 1988 Horlicks
 1989 The Phantom
 1990 Grey Philae
 1991 Fun On The Run
 1992 Seamist
 1993 Calm Harbour
 1994 Strategic
 1995 Kay Row
 1996 Sapio

Associated races
 
The Awapuni Gold Cup is currently raced in late March or early April on the same day as the:
 Group 1 Manawatu Sires Produce Stakes over 1400m for 2YO horses.
 Group 3 Manawatu Classic over 2000m for 3YO horses.
 Listed Flying Handicap over 1400m for Open Handicap runners.

Awapuni Racecourse is also the venue for the:
 Listed Marton Cup, an open handicap over 2200m in January. 
 Group 3 Manawatu Breeders Stakes over 2000m at weight for age for fillies and mares in April.
 Listed Anzac Mile, open handicap in late April
 Listed Rangitikei Gold Cup, an open handicap over 1600m in May.
 Group 3 Metric Mile, an open handicap over 1550m in September 
 Group 3 Eulogy Stakes, in mid-December over 1550m for 3YO fillies.
 Listed Feilding Gold Cup, an open handicap over 2100m in November.
 Group 3 Manawatu Cup, an open handicap over 2200m in December. 
 Group 2 Manawatu Challenge Stakes, a Weight For Age race over 1400m in December.

See also
 Thoroughbred racing in New Zealand
 Manawatu Sires Produce Stakes
 Easter Handicap

References

Sources

https://awapuniracing.co.nz/awapuni-gold-cup-winners

Horse races in New Zealand